Nina Bratchikova and Darija Jurak were the defending champions, but both players chose not to participate.

Magda Linette and Katarzyna Piter won the title, defeating Irina Buryachok and Valeria Solovyeva in the final, 6–2, 6–2.

Seeds

Draw

References 
 Main draw

Ankara Cup - Doubles
Ankara Cup